Nora Ruvalcaba Gámez (born 8 August 1967) is a Mexican educator and politician who is member of the National Regeneration Movement. She served as the party's first state president in Aguascalientes (2012–2015).

On August 31, 2021, she served as State Delegate of the Programs for the Development of the State of Aguascalientes; position from which she separated on January 7, 2022 to contain by the government of the state of Aguascalientes by MORENA.

She has served as Councilor in the  Aguascalientes Town Hall (2002–2004) and local Deputy to the Congress of Aguascalientes (2007–2010).

Career path

Education 
Nora Ruvalcaba studied at the Normal School of Aguascalientes and graduated with a degree in primary education. After her, she completed her studies at the Escuela Normal Superior, this time in social sciences. She finally obtained a third degree, at the Autonomous University of Aguascalientes as a Law graduate with a specialty in Constitutional.

Political career 

She began her political career within the Party of the Democratic Revolution (1997–2012), she was president of the Municipal Executive Committee in Aguascalientes (1997–2000), General Secretary of the State Executive Committee (2005–2007) and finally national councilor (2007–2010). She was councilor of the Town Hall of Municipality of Aguascalientes (2002–2004) and local deputy in the Sixtieth Legislature corresponding to the period 2007–2010. In 2010 she ran as a candidate for governor of Aguascalientes for the Party of the Democratic Revolution. In 2012 she was the founder of the National Regeneration Movement (Morena) in Aguascalientes and in 2016 she was a candidate for governor for said party, where she obtained fourth place with 3.18% of the vote. In addition, she was a candidate for federal deputy for the third district in the federal elections of 2015. She was the delegate of Programs for the Development of the State of Aguascalientes.

References

External links 
 

1967 births
Living people
Members of the Congress of Aguascalientes
21st-century Mexican politicians
Morena (political party) politicians
Party of the Democratic Revolution politicians
Autonomous University of Aguascalientes alumni
21st-century Mexican women politicians
Politicians from Aguascalientes
People from Pabellón de Arteaga Municipality